Deep Six is an English-language adventure novel by Clive Cussler published in the United States by Simon & Schuster in 1984.  This is the seventh book featuring the author's primary protagonist, Dirk Pitt.

Plot introduction
When a mysterious and extremely deadly poison spreads through the waters off the coast of Alaska killing everything it comes in contact with, including several scientists and members of the crew of a Coast Guard cutter, Dirk Pitt and his NUMA team are dispatched in an attempt to find the source of the poison.  When a member of his team is killed by the poison, Pitt vows to take revenge on whoever is responsible for the poison outbreak. The trail leads him to a powerful and extremely wealthy Korean shipping company matriarch and her grandson, and while pursuing them, Pitt uncovers a plot that could lead to the fall of the government of the United States.

Plot
In 1966, the refitted liberty ship San Marino is on its way from San Francisco to Auckland, New Zealand.  The ship is carrying more than eight million dollars' worth of titanium ingots as well as a mysterious passenger who goes by the name of Estelle Wallace.  Wallace is actually Arta Casilighio, a former bank teller at the Beverly-Wilshire bank who embezzled more than $120,000 and is making her getaway.  Unfortunately, a group of Korean seamen who came aboard as last-minute crew replacements have hijacked the ship and its cargo, and dispose of Wallace and the crew by paralyzing them with poison in their food and dropping them over the side into the depths of the ocean.

The story then flashes forward twenty-three years to the waters off of Augustine Island, Alaska where an extremely deadly poison is moving through the waters, killing everything it comes in contact with.  The poison comes to the notice of the Coast Guard cutter Catawaba when it intercepts a derelict crab boat called the Amie Marie.  The men sent aboard to investigate discover that the entire crew has died horribly, bleeding from every orifice and their skin had turned black.  The boarding party soon begins to exhibit symptoms themselves.  The doctor sent aboard orders the captain of the Catawaba to quarantine the crab boat and calls off his symptoms as the poison overtakes him, hoping that this information will help others in their diagnosis.

It is later revealed that the symptoms of the mysterious poison are strikingly similar to those of a deadly biological weapon, called Nerve Agent S, developed by the Rocky Mountain Arsenal outside of Colorado as the ideal weapon for use on troops wearing gas masks and protective clothing.  The agent clings to everything and is absorbed through the skin, resulting in almost immediate death. The weapon was eventually discontinued by the Army because it was as deadly to the troops deploying it as it was to the enemy. While en route to be buried in the Nevada desert, an entire boxcar carrying more than 1,000 gallons of Nerve Agent S disappeared.

Dirk Pitt and his friend, Assistant Projects Director Al Giordino are called away from their current project to assist the Environmental Protection Agency's Dr.  Julie Mendoza in an effort to find the source of the poison in what is assumed to be a sunken ship.  Pitt discovers that the liberty ship Pilottown is embedded into the shore of the island with only her stern exposed to the elements.  They board her and discover the containers of the nerve agent, but while they are attempting to recover the barrels, the volcano on the island erupts, causing the barrels to shift.  Dr. Mendoza is killed when her biohazard suit is punctured, exposing her to the poison.  Pitt vows to get to the bottom of who was responsible for the poison being on the ship and to take his revenge for the death of Dr. Mendoza.

In his attempts to trace the history of the Pilottown, Pitt discovers information on the wreck that leads him to the Alhambra Iron and Boiler Company in Charleston, South Carolina, and from there turns to NUMA computer expert Hiram Yaeger and St. Julien Perlmutter, a family friend and naval historian. They discover that the Pilottown has been part of a complicated web of bogus holding companies, insurance scams and piracy which saw her name changed several times, from San Marino to Belle Chase, and finally to Pilottown.  Eventually, they tie the ship to Bougainville Maritime Lines, a powerful company owned by the ruthless and mysterious Madame Min Koryo Bougainville.

Bougainville and her grandson, Lee Tong, have entered into an audacious plan with the Soviet Union to engineer the kidnapping of the President of the United States, the Vice President, the Speaker of the House and the President pro tempore of the Senate, the next three men in the line of succession to the presidency, as part of a project code-named Huckleberry Finn.  It is revealed that the Soviet economy is in ruins, a famine is spreading amongst the Eastern Bloc nations and the whole Eastern Bloc may be on the verge of collapse.  The Soviets have devised a plan that calls for the President to undergo a top-secret Soviet mind control procedure, termed "mind intervention", which uses a combination of an implanted microchip and injected memories from a brainwashed Soviet dissident to allow the Soviet government to control the President's thoughts without his knowledge.  The other three men are kept in reserve as the procedure only has about a 60% success rate.  In return for carrying out the abduction, the Bougainvilles are to receive one billion dollars in gold; however, both the Soviets and the Bougainvilles intend to double-cross the other.

When the disappearance of the President (and those next in the line of succession) on the Presidential yacht is discovered, Secretary of State Douglas Oates, now the acting president, orders a cover-up of the disappearance while a massive search is under way to find the kidnapped men. Congresswoman Loren Smith, the on again-off again lover of Dirk Pitt, is on a fact-finding mission aboard the Soviet cruise liner Leonid Andreyev off the coast of the United States and inadvertently witnesses Speaker of the House Alan Moran smuggled onto the ship by a KGB agent.  The Soviets learn of this and kidnap her as well.  Pitt discovers that Loren is missing and he and Giordino sneak about the Leonid Andreyev to find her. But after the Bougainvilles detonate a bomb that sinks the ship (part of their double-cross) she is kidnapped by Lee Tong, disguised as a steward, aboard a rescue boat.

Meanwhile, the President, now under control of the Soviets, returns to the White House and announces that while he was gone, he was negotiating a secret disarmament agreement with the Soviet President and has agreed to loan them billions of dollars in hard currency which they may use to purchase food and previously banned American high-technology products.  When he further announces his intention to pull the United States out of NATO and bring home all troops and missiles in Europe without the consent of Congress, Congress announces their intention to impeach him from office.  The President sends the Army to keep members of Congress from meeting; it appears that the United States now has what the Founding Fathers feared worst, a dictator in the White House.

Using information from Yaeger and Perlmutter, Pitt determines that the secret lab the Bougainvilles are hiding the remaining captives in is on a barge along the Mississippi River near New Orleans.  He and Giordino embark on unauthorized rescue mission with the aid of the local office of the FBI.  The agents are ambushed by Bougainville's security guards and it's up to Pitt and Giordino to rescue Loren and the Vice President. In a last-ditch effort to intercept the barge before it can be sunk at sea, Pitt commandeers the riverboat Stonewall Jackson and enlists the help of 40 members of the Sixth Louisiana Regiment of Confederate re-enactors. Armed with smooth bore muskets, as well as two Napoleon cannons that fire improvised charges, they launch an attack against the Bougainville's crew of stone-cold killers armed with automatic weapons, while Pitt attempts to board the barge and rescue Smith and Margolin before it is too late.

Characters
President Georgi Antonov - Soviet President and Communist Party Chairman who authorizes Project Huckleberry Finn.
Captain Melvin Belcheron - Captain of the riverboat Stonewall Jackson for more than 30 years.
Oskar Belkaya - Soviet dissident and artist whose brainwashed memories are transplanted into the brain of the President.
George Blackowl - Acting supervisor and advance agent for the president's movements. Blackowl was in charge on a night when the president was abducted.
Madame Min Koryo Bougainville - Matriarch of the Bougainville shipping dynasty. She is eighty-nine years old, weighs about 40 kilograms, and uses a wheelchair.  When she was twelve her father sold her to a Frenchman named René Bougainville, who operated a small shipping line.  She bore him three sons, but all three sons and her husband were killed during World War II, leaving only her and one grandson to run the company.  She is driven by a mad need for revenge against the Americans who killed her husband and her three sons during World War II.
Martin Brogan - Director of the Central Intelligence Agency.
Sal Casio - Private investigator who is attempting to find out what happened to Arta Casilighio/Estelle Wallace, who was his daughter.  He found out that she disappeared on the San Marino and he lets Pitt know that the money she stole finally showed up more than 20 years later in dribs and drabs at foreign banks. Casio joins forces with Pitt and attempt to kill Min Koryo Bougainville at the very end of the book.
Lt. Commander Amos Dover - Captain of the Coast Guard cutter Catawaba.
Dr. Raymond Edgeley - Head of Project Fathom, the CIA program for mind intervention, who uses his methods and project equipment to intercept the Soviet control over the President and feed them false data.
Sam Emmett - Director of the Federal Bureau of Investigation.
Daniel Fossett - Presidential Chief of Staff.
 Albert Giordino - Assistant Special Projects Director for the National Underwater and Marine Agency.
Lt. Ulysses S. Grant - Pilot of a four engine Navy reconnaissance plane who provides television coverage and commentary of the attempt to save the Vice President and Congresswoman Smith.
Ben Greenwald - Director of the Secret Service. While rushing to a meeting following the abduction of the President, he is killed when he broadsides a street sweeper that was making a U-turn in front of his car.
Senator Marcus Larimer - President Pro Tempore of the Senate.  Larimer escapes with Congressman Moran and KGB agent Paul Suvorov from the Bougainville laboratory, but dies while trying to save passengers during the sinking of the Leonid Andreyev.
Major Leroy LaRoche - Travel agent, loving husband and father by day and commanding officer of the Sixth Louisiana Regiment of the Confederate States Army on the weekends.
Lt. Marty Lawrence - Catawaba officer in Amie Marie boarding party who dies mysteriously.
Oscar Lucas - Special Agent in charge of the Presidential Protection Division of the Secret Service.
Dr. Aleksei Lugovoy - Soviet representative to World Health Assembly, he is in fact a psychologist who specializes in the art of brainwashing.  He is part of a plot between Madame Bougainville and the Soviet Union to kidnap the President of the United States, the Vice President, the Speaker of the House, and the President pro tempore of the Senate (the leader of the United States and the next three men in line), using a process called mind intervention, which brainwashes them and placing them under Soviet control.
Vincent Margolin - Vice President of the United States.
Dr. Julie Mendoza - Chairman of the regional emergency response team and a senior biochemical engineer for the Environmental Protection Agency.  While attempting to recover the nerve agent from the Pilottown, Mendoza is killed when the volcano erupts, causing one of the drums to fall on her legs, piercing her contamination suit and bringing her in contact with the nerve agent.
Alan Mercier - National Security Adviser.
General Clayton Metcalf - Chairman of the Joint Chiefs of Staff.
Congressman Alan Moran - Speaker of the House.  Moran is described as manipulative, oily, and corrupt.  After escaping from the Bougainville lab, Moran attempts to manipulate the situation and assume the presidency before the Vice President can be rescued.
Ensign Pat Murphy - Catawaba officer and part of Amie Marie boarding party, who dies from exposure to the nerve agent.
Douglas Oates - Secretary of State and the next in line to be president following the abductions of the next three men in the line of succession.
 St. Julien Perlmutter - A giant of a man who weighs more than 200 kilograms, he's described as Santa Clause gone to seed.  Perlmutter possesses what is acknowledged by experts as the finest collection of historical ship literature ever assembled.
Dirk Pitt - Special Projects Director for the National Underwater and Marine Agency.
Captain Yakov Pokofsky - Captain of the Soviet liner Leonid Andreyev on which the KGB is hiding Loren Smith, Congressman Moran, and Senator Larimer.  The ship is later sunk as part of the Bougainville plot.
Vladimir Polevoi - Head of the Committee for State Security (KGB).
Admiral James Sandecker - Director of the National Underwater and Marine Agency
Jesse Simmons - Secretary of Defense.
Congresswoman Loren Smith - Second term congresswoman from the state of Colorado: she is also the on again-off again lover of Dirk Pitt.	
Paul Suvorov - KGB officer in charge of monitoring Dr. Lugovoy.  Convinced that the project does not have the backing of the Soviet government Surorov throws a monkey wrench into the brainwashing plan when he breaks out of the lab with two of the subjects.
Jack Sutton - An actor who routinely does an impersonation of the president in TV commercials and on comedy shows.
Lt. Commander Isaac Thayer - Catawaba medical officer who quarantines the Amie Marie before also succumbing to the nerve agent.
Lee Tong - Grandson of Madame Min Koryo Bougainville.  A graduate of the Wharton Business School, he runs the Bougainville Maritime Line and its fleet of 138 cargo ships and tankers, though he keeps to the background and is not even listed as a director or employee of the company.  He is primarily responsible for the dirty tricks department which built the base of the company.
Estelle Wallace (a.k.a. Arta Casilighio) - A teller at the Beverly-Wilshire bank who embezzles more than $128,000 after she discovered a passport under the seat of a Wilshire Boulevard bus that bore the name Estelle Wallace and a startling similarity in appearance to her own.  She attempts her getaway on the cargo freighter San Marino bound for Auckland, New Zealand, when it is hijacked by Korean sailors working for Bougainville Maritime.
Hiram Yaeger - Computer guru for the National Underwater and Marine Agency.

Allusions to other works
The author quotes Henry Wadsworth Longfellow's "The Arrow and the Song": "I shot an arrow into the air, it fell to earth I know not where."

Release details
1984, United States, Simon & Schuster , May 1984, Hardcover
1990, United States, Pocket Reissue Edition, February 1, 1990.
2005, United States, Pocket Star Reissue Edition, December 27, 2005.

References

1984 American novels
Dirk Pitt novels
Fiction about mind control
Novels set in Alaska
United States presidential succession in fiction
Simon & Schuster books
Books with cover art by Paul Bacon